Terezinha (Little Tereza) is a city located in the state of Pernambuco, Brazil. Located  at 251 km away from Recife, capital of the state of Pernambuco, it has an estimated (IBGE 2020) population of 7,198 inhabitants.

Geography
 State – Pernambuco
 Region – Agreste Pernambucano
 Boundaries – Garanhuns and Saloá   (N);  Bom Conselho    (S and W);  Brejão   (E).
 Area – 
 Elevation – 736 m
 Hydrography – Ipanema River
 Vegetation – Subcaducifólia forest
 Climate – Semi arid hot
 Annual average temperature – 26.0 c
 Distance to Recife – 251 km

Economy
The main economic activities in Terezinha are based in agribusiness, especially beans, manioc, coffee; and livestock such as cattle and poultry.

Economic indicators

Economy by Sector
2006

Health indicators

References

Municipalities in Pernambuco